Anil Aggrawal's Internet Journal of Forensic Medicine and Toxicology is an online scientific journal covering forensic medicine and toxicology and allied subjects such as criminology, police science, and deviant behavior. It is one of the most widely read and popular peer-reviewed forensic medicine journals in the world. The journal is published semiannually and is indexed by EMBASE, Chemical Abstracts Service, Locatorplus, EBSCO, Indianjournals.com, and Scopus. It was established by Anil Aggrawal (Maulana Azad Medical College, New Delhi) in 2000.

Thematic issues 
The journal has produced several thematic issues on forensic entomology edited by Mark Benecke of Germany, on crime scene investigation edited by Daryl Clemens, and on toxicology edited by V.V.Pillay of India.

References

External links 
 Anil Aggrawal's Internet Journal of Book Reviews (Sister publication)

Academic works about forensics
Open access journals
Publications established in 2000
Biannual journals
Toxicology journals
English-language journals
Criminology journals